INS Aditya (A59) is an Aditya class replenishment and repair ship currently in service with the Indian Navy. The ship was launched on 15 November 1993  and commissioned on 3 April 2000.

INS Aditya is a fully air-conditioned and lengthened version of the original Deepak class, but with a multipurpose workshop and with four RAS (Replenishment At Sea) stations alongside. The ship was built at Garden Reach Shipbuilders and Engineers (GRSE). Building progress was very slow and the ship was plagued by propulsion problems, during her sea trials in September 1999.

Description 
The ship has a cargo capacity of 2250 m³ water, 2170 m³ ammunition and stores and 14,200 m³ diesel and aviation kerosene. The ship can carry 12,000 tons of liquid cargo, comprising LSHSD, aviation kerosene, distilled & fresh water and 5000 tons of solid cargo. The ship features a Hallapa deck and Canadian Hepburn RAS (Replenishment At Sea) equipment. Aditya is also equipped with a 2-ton heavy jackstay and a 20-ton crane. It can replenish four warships & one rotor aircraft simultaneously and was designed to be able to serve as command and control platform. It can refuel at the maximum rate of 600 tonnes per hour.

Aditya was initially armed with light and medium machine guns. The self-defence capability was added by installing new close-in weapons like anti-aircraft and anti-missile guns and missiles. It carries a helicopter as compared to only a helicopter deck of Jyoti.

Service history
In 2010, INS Aditya, along with three other warships of the navy - INS Mysore, INS Tabar and INS Ganga, were deployed to South Africa and took part in the 2nd IBSAMAR, the joint exercise of the navies of India, Brazil and South Africa. A total of 11 warships took part in the exercise, which was conducted off the coast of Durban from 13 to 27 September.

Gallery

See also

INS Deepak (A50)
INS Shakti (A57)
INS Jyoti (A58)

References 

 Aditya class at Bharat-Rakshak – Retrieved on 2009-04-19

Aditya
Ships built in India
1993 ships